Will Ogdon (April 19, 1921 – October 6, 2013) was an American composer. He taught at the University of California, San Diego beginning in 1966, and retiring in 1991.) His students included composer Louise Spizizen.

He was originally from Redlands, California. He studied composition with Ernst Krenek, Roger Sessions, and René Leibowitz, and acquired a doctorate in music theory from Indiana University.

He has collaborated with the singer Carol Plantamura.

He lived in Del Mar, California.

Discography
1997 - The Music Of Will Ogdon. Composers Recordings, Inc.

References

 Négyesy, János, and Garrett Bowles, collectors and compilers. A Festschrift for Will Ogdon. .
 Négyesy, János, and Garrett Bowles, collectors and compilers. The Collected Writings of Will Ogdon. .

External links
 Will Ogdon page
 Will Ogdon article

1921 births
2013 deaths
20th-century classical composers
20th-century American composers
20th-century American male musicians
American classical composers
American male classical composers
Indiana University alumni
People from Redlands, California
People from Del Mar, California
Pupils of Ernst Krenek
Pupils of Roger Sessions
University of California, San Diego alumni